"Move" is a single by CSS, it is the third released from the album Donkey. It was released on October 13, 2008. It was remixed by Cut Copy and Frankmusik. The single failed to chart everywhere, except for Italy. It is featured in the forever 21 playlist. A remix of the song was used for a jazz routine on So You Think You Can Dance season 5, which was performed by Janette Manrana and Evan Kasprzak, and later season 8 for a solo by jazz dancer Missy Morelli.

Music video
There's a music video for the song directed by Keith Schofield, shot in Barcelona. It can be seen on YouTube and on CSS's official MySpace.

Track listings
CD
"Move" (album version)
"Move" (Frankmusik's club bingo dub)

7" vinyl
A. "Move" (album version)
B. "Move" (Cut Copy remix)

Digital
"Move"
"Move" (Metronomy remix)

12" maxi vinyl
A1. "Move" (Cut Copy remix)
A2. "Move" (album version)
B1. "Move" (Metronomy remix)
B2. "Move" (Frankmusik club bingo dub)
B3. "Move" (instrumental version)

Promo
"Move" (album version)
"Move" (instrumental)

References

CSS (band) songs
2008 singles
Songs written by Adriano Cintra
Songs written by Lovefoxxx
2008 songs
Sub Pop singles